Megan Rhodes Smith (born October 8, 1985) is the current head coach of Belmont softball team.

Coaching career

Western Kentucky
On August 17, 2012, Rhodes Smith was hired as an assistant coach for the Western Kentucky softball program.

Lipscomb
Prior to the 2014 season, Rhodes Smith was hired as an assistant coach working primarily with the pitchers, before being promoted to associate head coach in 2018.

Belmont
On July 12, 2019, Rhodes Smith was announced as the new head coach of the Belmont softball program. Rhodes Smith went 5–14 in her lone season at the helm of the Bruins, one which was shortened due to the COVID-19 pandemic.

Tennessee
In July 2020, after just one season as head coach at Belmont, Rhodes Smith returned to her alma mater to become the pitching coach.

Head coaching record

College

References

Living people
1985 births
American softball coaches
Female sports coaches
Tennessee Volunteers softball players
Belmont Bruins softball coaches
Lipscomb Bisons softball coaches
Western Kentucky Lady Toppers softball coaches
Middle Tennessee Blue Raiders softball coaches
Charleston Southern Buccaneers softball coaches
Sportspeople from Nashville, Tennessee
Softball players from Tennessee
Softball coaches from Tennessee